
Year 234 BC was a year of the pre-Julian Roman calendar. At the time it was known as the Year of the Consulship of Albinus and Ruga (or, less frequently, year 520 Ab urbe condita). The denomination 234 BC for this year has been used since the early medieval period, when the Anno Domini calendar era became the prevalent method in Europe for naming years.

Events 
 By place 

 Greece 
 The Epirote Alliance is replaced by the Epirote League, which is a federal state with its own parliament (or synedrion).
 The city of Pleuron is destroyed by Demetrius II.
 After the resignation of Lydiades, the city of Megalopolis joins the Achaean League.

 Roman Republic 
 Corsica, Sardinia and Liguria rebel unsuccessfully against Rome.

 China 
 The Qin general Huan Yi wins a major victory over the Zhao general Hu Zhe in the Battle of Pingyang, and captures Pingyang and Wucheng.

Births 
 Marcus Porcius Cato (Cato the Elder), Roman statesman, (d. 149 BC)
 Mete Khan, Xiongnu emperor, (d. 174 BC)

Deaths 
 Pharnavaz I of Iberia, King of Georgia
 Zenodotus of Ephesus, first librarian of the Library of Alexandria

References